Archie is a tool for indexing FTP archives, allowing users to more easily identify specific files. It is considered the first Internet search engine. The original implementation was written in 1990 by Alan Emtage, then a postgraduate student at McGill University in Montreal, Canada.

Archie has since been superseded by other, more sophisticated search engines, including Jughead and Veronica. These were in turn superseded by search engines like Yahoo! in 1995 and Google in 1998. Work on Archie ceased in the late 1990s. A legacy Archie server is still maintained active for historic purposes in Poland at University of Warsaw's Interdisciplinary Centre for Mathematical and Computational Modelling.

Origin 
Archie first appeared in 1986, while Deutsch was the systems manager at the McGill University School of Computer Science. His predecessor had attempted to persuade the institution to connect to the Internet, but due to the expensive cost — roughly $35,000 per year for a sluggish link to Boston — it had been challenging to persuade the appropriate parties that the investment was worthwhile. 

The name derives from the word "archive" without the v. Emtage has said that contrary to popular belief, there was no association with the Archie Comics. Despite this, other early Internet search technologies such as Jughead and Veronica were named after characters from the comics. Anarchie, one of the earliest graphical FTP clients was named for its ability to perform Archie searches.

How Archie worked
The earliest versions of Archie would simply search a list of public anonymous File Transfer Protocol (FTP) sites using the Telnet protocol and create an index of the FTP files. FTP is essentially a way to transfer files between computers. To view the contents of a file, it had first to be downloaded. The indexes are updated on a regular basis (contacting each roughly once a month, so as not to waste too many resources of the remote servers) and requested a listing. These listings were stored in local files to be searched using the Unix  command.

The developers populated the engine's servers with databases of anonymous FTP host directories. This was used to find specific file titles since the list was plugged in to a searchable database of FTP sites. Archie did not recognize natural language requests nor index the content inside the files. Therefore, users had to know the title of the file they wanted. The ability to index the content inside the files was first introduced by Gopher.

Development 
Emtage and Heelan wrote a script allowing people to log in and search collected information using the Telnet protocol at the host "archie.mcgill.ca" [132.206.2.3]. Later, more efficient front- and back-ends were developed, and the system spread from a local tool, to a network-wide resource, and a popular service available from multiple sites around the Internet. The collected data would be exchanged between the neighbouring Archie servers. The servers could be accessed in multiple ways: using a local client (such as archie or xarchie); telnetting to a server directly; sending queries by electronic mail; and later via a World Wide Web interface. At the zenith of its fame the Archie search engine accounted for 50% of Montreal Internet traffic.

In 1992, Emtage along with Deutsch and some financial help of McGill University formed Bunyip Information Systems the world's first company expressly founded for and dedicated to providing Internet information services with a licensed commercial version of the Archie search engine used by millions of people worldwide. Heelan followed them into Bunyip soon after, where he together with Bibi Ali and Sandro Mazzucato was a part of so-called Archie Group. The group significantly updated the archie database and indexed web-pages. Work on the search engine ceased in the late 1990s.

See also
 Alan Emtage
 Jughead
 Veronica
 Wide area information server

References

Further reading
Archie—A Darwinian Development Process. Peter Deutsch. IEEE Internet Computing, January/February 2000, 4(1):69-71. Part of Millennial Forecasts, .
P. Deutsch, A. Emtage, A. Marine, How to Use Anonymous FTP (RFC1635, May 1994)

External links
 Last surviving Archie web interface - search seems to be dead (timeout)

Internet Standards
Unix Internet software
Internet search engines
History of the Internet